Pheronematidae is a family of sponges belonging to the order Amphidiscosida.

Genera:
 Hernandeziana Strand, 1932
 Ijimalophus Van Soest & Hooper, 2020
 Pheronema Leidy, 1868
 Pheronemoides Li, 2017
 Platylistrum Schulze, 1904
 Poliopogon Thomson, 1877
 Schulzeviella Tabachnick, 1990
 Semperella Gray, 1868
 Sericolophus Ijima, 1901

References

Sponges